Nephop is the Nepalese form of hip hop. Its major elements include alternative hip hop, avant-grade hip hop, breakbeat, freestyling and DJing. Rap culture was introduced in Nepal through electronic DJs mixing the classical Nepalese songs with the Western urban style in the early eighties. Later, it took the form of artists releasing songs with commercial beats in the 1990s.

History

Popularity growth (early 2000s) 

The first Nepali rap song is considered to be "Batti Balera" by the comedian Ratan Subedi, released in 1995.

In 2000, Girish Khatiwada and Pranil Timilsina started the rap culture. In 2000 Rappaz Union (Sammy Samrat and Nirnaya Shrestha created the first Nepalese rap album in English. In 2002, GP (Girish Khatiwada and Pranil L Timalsena) released the album Back Again. The song "Ma Yesto Chhu Ma testo Chhu" featuring DA69 was the first rap song to attract broad Nepalese audiences to rap music. Another song on the album is "Timi Jaha Pani Jaanchhau".

In 2003, Nurbu Sherpa released his debut album Nurbu Sherpa Representin' K.T.M.C. ("K.T.M.C." meaning Kathmandu Metropolitan City). This was the first Nepalese hip hop album recorded in the United States, for which he was nominated for the Best Music Video Award.  In 2004, The Unity {Aidray,  DA69(Sudin Pokhrel) and Asif Shah } brought out their first album Girish & The Unity presents X with Girish Khatiwada (Gorkhali G.) It included "She's the Bomb", the music video for which became a major success in the local charts. Other songs on this album were "Malai Vote Deu", a satire to politics, "Da Drug Song", and "Anything" feat. Abhaya Subba and the Steam Injuns.

Rise of the underground (2003–2008) 

In 2003, underground rapper Naz, based in New York City, and DJ AJ, based in Toronto, spearheaded the first Nepalese underground hip hop movement through their now-defunct website nephop.org and thus gave birth to a new Nepalese music genre called Nephop. The movement soon gained worldwide popularity and "Nephop" was accepted as a portmanteau of "Nepalese hip hop". The online portal gave a platform to showcase the talents of all the budding rappers spread worldwide among the Nepalese diaspora.

In 2004, Naz released his first underground single, "Chudaina", produced by DJ AJ. In 2005, Nepsydaz, a rap group, had commercial success with their version of the same song. Naz gained massive notoriety for his next single "Katti Khep". This single had great success in the underground circuit because of its extremely explicit content. Naz quickly capitalize on his success by releasing his next single "Killin' Terraces", which the New Urban Music Blog considered one of the best Nepalese political rap songs.

Naz received some mainstream exposure after being featured on Nurbu Sherpa's single "Baby Gurl", from Nurbu's second album, Save Nepal. "Baby Gurl" was voted one of the top ten songs of 2008 in Nepal by Fursad.com. Nurbu also featured Naz and other underground rappers in his next single, "When I'm Around", from his third album.

2012 
In 2012, Yama Buddha debuted with his first official Rap song 'Sathi'. Also, YB is known as the king of nephop. Although over the years many rappers have emerged on the radar. Most notable rappers such as Uniq Poet, Grizzle, Kavi G, Laure, Yoddha, Vten, Nasty, Sacar aka Lil Buddha, Balen, Nawaj Ansari and recently Dong,Vyoma and G-Bob have been trending among Nepali audiences in recent years. Along with the artists, the rap genre is getting quite diverse with the rising of the drill, trap, and even getting influences from the birthplace of rap.

Notable People 
 Yama Buddha
 Girish Khatiwada
 VTEN
 Laure (Nepalese rapper)
 Pranil L Timalsena
 Nirnaya Shrestha
 Manas Ghale
 Balen
Asif Shah

See also 
 Music of Nepal

References

External links 

Hip hop